Stephen, Steven or Steve Holmes may refer to:
Stephen Holmes (political scientist), American political scientist
Stephen Holmes (CIA), American intelligence officer
Steve Holmes (actor) (born 1961), Romanian-born German pornographic actor
Steve Holmes (footballer) (born 1971), retired English footballer
Steven Holmes (born 1965), Canadian curator
Steven Holmes (rugby league), Australian rugby league footballer 
Stephen Holmes (diplomat), British High Commissioner to Australia 1952–1956
Stephen Holmes (actor), guest actor in "Gehenna" TV episode
Stephen Holmes (died 1978), first victim of UK serial killer Dennis Nilsen
Stephen Holmes, candidate in the 2007 Ontario provincial election